Events from the year 1612 in Sweden

Incumbents
 Monarch – Gustaf II Adolf

Events

 11 February  - Battle of Vittsjö.
 26 February - , 300 Norwegian soldiers are massacred inside a church in Nya Lödöse.
 - Battle of Kölleryd.

Births

 - Per Stålhammar, officer (died 1701)

Deaths

 - Karin Månsdotter, royal mistress and queen  (born 1550)

References

 
Years of the 17th century in Sweden
Sweden